Menachem Avidom (January 6, 1908 – August 5, 1995) was an Israeli composer. His Hebrew surname is the combination of the names of his daughters Daniella and Miriam (Avi - the father of; D - for Daniella; O - and; M - for Miriam).

Biography
Avidom was born Mendel Mahler-Kalkstein in Stanislaviv, Austria-Hungary on January 6, 1908. This put him in Poland after World War I. He emigrated to Mandate Palestine in 1925 and, soon after, went to study at the American University of Beirut (from 1926 to 1928). After further studies at the Paris Conservatory (from 1928 to 1931) with Henri Rabaud, he moved to Tel Aviv, where he taught music theory. From 1945 through 1952 he served as general secretary of the Israeli Philharmonic. In 1955 he was named director of the Society of Authors, Composers and Music Publishers in Israel (ACUM); a post he remained in for twenty five years. He was also chair of the Israel Composer's League from 1958 through 1971.

He died in Tel Aviv, Israel, on August 5, 1995.

Awards
 In 1961, Avidom was awarded the Israel Prize for music, in recognition of his opera Alexandra ha'Hashmonait.

Works
Vocal
In Every Generation, opera, 1955
Alexandra ha'Hashmonait, opera, 1961
The Farewell, opera, 1971
The First Sin, opera, 1980
Me'Arat Yodfat, opera
4 other operas
Kantatat t'hilim, cantata, 1955
12 Hills, cantata, 1976

Orchestral
Symphony No. 3: Yam tichonit, 1952
9 other symphonies
Flute Concerto
Concertino for violin and orchestra

Chamber music
Suite on B-A-C-H, chamber ensemble, 1964
Brass Quintet, 1969
Sonata for unaccompanied viola, 1984

See also
List of Israel Prize recipients

References

Further reading 
 Don Randel. The Harvard Biographical Dictionary of Music. Harvard, 1996, p. 32.

1908 births
1995 deaths
People from Ivano-Frankivsk
People from the Kingdom of Galicia and Lodomeria
Ukrainian Jews
Jews from Galicia (Eastern Europe)
Polish emigrants to Mandatory Palestine
Jews in Mandatory Palestine
Israeli people of Ukrainian-Jewish descent
20th-century classical composers
Israeli composers
Male classical composers
20th-century male musicians
American University of Beirut alumni
Israel Prize in music recipients